Shame on You, Brigitte! (German: Schäm' dich, Brigitte!) is a 1952 Austrian comedy film directed by E.W. Emo and starring Heinz Rühmann, Hans Moser and Theo Lingen. It was later released in West Germany under the alternative title Wir werden das Kind schon schaukeln. It is based on the play Bubusch, a German-language version of a work by Hungarian writer Gábor Vaszary, which had previously been adapted into the 1943 German film Geliebter Schatz.

The film was made with the backing of Gloria Film, which handled its distribution in the lucrative West German market. It was shot at the Schönbrunn Studios and on location around Vienna. The film's sets were designed by the art director Gustav Abel.

Synopsis
When a mathematics teacher discovers a love letter on one of his students, Brigitte Schneider, he goes to visit her family to inform them. However, she persuades the maid to pretend to be her mother. Further confusion arises when her real mother later discovers the letter and assumes it has been written by her husband to his own lover.

Cast
 Heinz Rühmann as Dr. Felix Schneider
 Hans Moser as Professor Karl Stieglitz
 Theo Lingen as Paul Fellmeier
 Hilde Berndt as Lilli Schneider
 Brigitte Ratz as Brigitte Schneider
 Annie Rosar as Lilli Schneiders Mutter
 Lotte Lang as Marie, Dienstmädchen
 Margarete Slezak as Rosi Stieglitz
 Nadja Tiller as Olga Fellmeier
 Gusti Wolf as Hilde - Wirtin und falsche Braut
 Egon von Jordan as Dr. Haberer, Rechtsanwalt 
 Fritz Heller as Herr Kraus
 Chariklia Baxevanos as Hertha Engelberger

References

Bibliography 
 Fritsche, Maria. Homemade Men in Postwar Austrian Cinema: Nationhood, Genre and Masculinity. Berghahn Books, 2013.

External links 
 

1952 films
1952 comedy films
Austrian comedy films
1950s German-language films
Films directed by E. W. Emo
Gloria Film films
Films shot at Schönbrunn Studios
Films shot in Vienna
Austrian films based on plays